Flint corn (Zea mays var. indurata; also known as Indian corn or sometimes calico corn) is a variant of maize, the same species as common corn. Because each kernel has a hard outer layer to protect the soft endosperm, it is likened to being hard as flint; hence the name.
The six major types of corn are dent corn, flint corn, pod corn, popcorn, flour corn, and sweet corn.

History
With less soft starch than dent corn (Zea mays indentata), flint corn does not have the dents in each kernel from which dent corn gets its name. This is one of the three types of corn cultivated by Native Americans, both in New England and across the northern tier, including tribes such as the Pawnee on the Great Plains. Archaeologists have found evidence of such corn cultivation in what is now the United States before 1000 BC. Corn was originally domesticated in Mexico by native peoples about 9,000 years ago. They used many generations of selective breeding to transform a wild teosinte grass with small grains into the rich source of food that is modern Zea mays.

Distinctive traits 
Because flint corn has a very low water content, it is more resistant to freezing than other vegetables. It was the only Vermont crop to survive New England's infamous "Year Without a Summer" of 1816.

Coloration
The coloration of flint corn is often different from white and yellow dent corns, many of which were bred later. Most flint corn is multi-colored. Like the Linnaeus variant of maize, any kernel may contain the yellow pigment zeaxanthin but at more varying concentrations.

Regional varieties with specific coloration include Blue corn and Purple corn.

Uses 
Popcorn (Zea mays everta, "corn turned inside out") is considered a variant of this type. It has a hard, slightly translucent kernel.

Flint corn is also the type of corn preferred for making hominy, a staple food in the Americas since pre-Columbian times.

In the United States the flint corn cultivars that have large proportions of kernels with hues outside the yellow range are primarily used ornamentally as part of Thanksgiving decorations. They are often called either "ornamental corn" or "Indian corn", although each of those names has other meanings as well. These varieties can be popped and eaten as popcorn, although many people incorrectly believe that such colored varieties are not palatable or are poisonous.

References

Maize varieties